Hicham Lasri (born April 13, 1977) is a Moroccan comics artist, film director, novelist, producer and screenwriter.

Biography 
Lasri was born on April 13, 1977 in Casablanca. He grew up in a family of five brothers and a sister. After obtaining a degree in law, he changed orientation and begins a career of playwright. He was a student of the screenwriter Emmanuelle Sardou and the filmmaker Hassan Leghzouli. Then he did an internship supervised by Sylvie Bailly, that allowed him to deepen his training on Sitcoms.

Career 
He became the protégé of Nabil Ayouch and wrote his first screenplay in 2002 for one of his films, La légende d'Arhaz,  while also being the screenwriter of Lahcen Zinoun for La beauté éparpillée (2006).

From 2004 to 2006, he worked as director of writing in Nabil Ayouch's company, Ali n’prod, he will remain so between April 2006 and June 2007, for the "Film industry" project. He worked also as an artistic director and took the opportunity to direct Le peuple de l’horloge, an 81-minute fiction.

In 2010, he co-produced Terminus des anges with Narjiss Nejjar and Mohamed Mouftakir. His first solo feature film was The end, produced in by Lamia Chraibi and her company La Prod.

In his second movie, C'est eux les chiens... (2013), he made the parallel between the Moroccan riots of 1981 and the February 20 Movement. All in the form of a rather nervous docufiction. After being selected at ACID in Cannes, the film was screened at 32 other international festivals between 2013 and 2015, including FESPACO, Malmo and the Carthage Film Festival. Lasri's other films were also selected four times at the Berlinale between 2014 and 2018.

His first Documentary, Nayda?, looks back at the 2000s Moroccan "Nayda" movement, likened to the Spanish Movida.

Works

Filmography

Films

Television

Web series

Novels

Graphic novels

References

External links 

 

1977 births
Living people
Moroccan film directors
Moroccan screenwriters
Moroccan writers
People from Casablanca